Anna Sagtanovna Nurmukhambetova (born 28 July 1993 in Kokshetau) is a Kazakhstani weightlifter representing Kazakhstan. She originally finished fifth in the 69kg event at the 2012 Summer Olympics, but was later upgraded to silver after disqualifications. Due to the fact that she is currently suspended for an Anti-Doping Rule Violation she is not eligible to receive her reallocated silver medal until September 17, 2023.

References

External links
 
 
 

1993 births
Living people
Sportspeople from Kokshetau
Kazakhstani female weightlifters
Olympic weightlifters of Kazakhstan
Weightlifters at the 2012 Summer Olympics
Olympic medalists in weightlifting
Medalists at the 2012 Summer Olympics
21st-century Kazakhstani women